Hilbert's eighth problem is one of David Hilbert's list of open mathematical problems posed in 1900. It concerns number theory, and in particular the Riemann hypothesis, although it is also concerned with the Goldbach Conjecture. The problem as stated asked for more work on the distribution of primes and generalizations of Riemann hypothesis to other rings where prime ideals take the place of primes.

Subtopics

Riemann hypothesis and generalizations

Hilbert calls for a solution to the Riemann hypothesis, which has long been regarded as the deepest open problem in mathematics. Given the solution, he calls for more thorough investigation into Riemann's zeta function and the prime number theorem.

Goldbach conjecture

He calls for a solution to the Goldbach conjecture, as well as more general problems, such as finding infinitely many pairs of primes solving a fixed linear diophantine equation.

Twin prime conjecture

Generalized Riemann conjecture

Finally, he calls for mathematicians to generalize the ideas of the Riemann hypothesis to counting prime ideals in a number field.

External links 
 English translation of Hilbert's original address

08

References